Senegalia pennata (cha-om, ; ; Meiteilon : khang, Thadou-Kuki: khang-khu, Paite Language: Khangkhuh, Mizo: khanghu, Hmar: khanghmuk, Biate: khang-hu, Malay: petai duri), is a species of plant which is native to South and Southeast Asia. Its leaves are bipinnate with linear-oblong and glabrous pinnules. Its yellowish flowers are terminal panicles with globose heads. The pods are thin, flat and long with thick sutures.

Uses

In Northeast India, in the states of Mizoram and Manipur, climbing wattle is an ingredient in indigenous cuisine like kaang-hou (fried vegetables) and eromba.  The plant is locally known as khanghmuk in Hmar, khang in Meiteilon and khanghu in Mizo.

In Burma, Cambodia, Laos, Indonesia and Thailand, the feathery shoots of Senegalia pennata are used in soups, curries, omelettes and stir-fries. The edible shoots are picked up before they become tough and thorny.

In Northern Thai cuisine, cha-om is also eaten raw with Thai salads, such as tam mamuang (mango salad), and it is one of the ingredients of kaeng khae curry. In Central Thailand and Isan it is usually boiled or fried. Cha-om omelet pieces are one of the usual ingredients of nam phrik pla thu and commonly used in kaeng som, a sour Thai curry.

In Vietnam, the plant is cultivated in the Northwest region such as Sơn La and Lai Châu provinces, by the Thái and Khơ Mú ethnic groups as a delicacy vegetable. The leaves have a distinctively stinky odor, and are used in salads (especially with mountain ebony flowers - Bauhinia variegata), as well as in stir-fries, grilled fish, pork or buffalo dishes.

See also
 List of plants with edible leaves
 Thai cuisine
 Lao cuisine
 Flora of Madhya Pradesh
 List of ingredients in Burmese cuisine
 List of Thai ingredients

References

External links

Thai vegetables
FAO - The Vegetable Sector in Thailand

pennata
Drought-tolerant trees
Thai cuisine